Pablo Franco Martín (born 11 June 1980) is a Spanish football manager, he was the head coach  of Tanzanian club Simba from 2021 to 31 May 2022.

Manager career
Born in Madrid, Franco was an assistant manager at Coria CF and CF Fuenlabrada, and started his managerial career at CD Santa Eugenia in 2010. On 27 January 2012 he returned to Fuenlabrada, now as a fitness coach.

On 5 July 2012 Franco was named CD Illescas manager, with his side in Tercera División. On 11 June of the following year he was appointed at the helm of fellow league team CD Puertollano; in his first and only campaign he led the club to a first position in their group, but the Castile-La Mancha side renounced promotion due to financial problems.

On 28 July 2014 Franco was appointed Getafe CF B manager. On 26 February of the following year, after the resignation of Quique Flores, he was named interim manager of the main squad, and appeared in his professional match two days later, a 2–3 away loss against Málaga CF.

On 3 March 2015 Franco's spell in the main squad was further extended, with Javier Casquero as his assistant. Eight days later, after a 2–1 away win against Córdoba CF, the duo was officially granted until the end of the season.

On 1 June 2015, after avoiding relegation with the main squad, he was relieved from his duties. On 10 March of the following year he was appointed manager of Georgian club FC Saburtalo Tbilisi, joining compatriot Manolo Hierro.

Managerial statistics

References

External links

Soccerway profile

1980 births
Living people
Sportspeople from Madrid
Spanish football managers
La Liga managers
CD Puertollano managers
Getafe CF managers
Spanish expatriate football managers
Spanish expatriate sportspeople in Georgia (country)
Expatriate football managers in Georgia (country)
Qadsia SC managers
Spanish expatriate sportspeople in Kuwait
Expatriate football managers in Kuwait
Expatriate football managers in China
FC Saburtalo Tbilisi managers
Spanish expatriate sportspeople in China
Kuwait Premier League managers